Rider on the Rain (French: Le passager de la pluie) is a 1970 French mystery thriller film starring Marlène Jobert and Charles Bronson, directed by René Clément and scripted by Sébastien Japrisot, produced by Serge Silberman, with film music composed by Francis Lai. It won the Golden Globe Award for Best Foreign Language Film.

Plot

Opening with a quotation from Lewis Carroll to suggest that the heroine is like Alice in Wonderland, the film starts on a rainy autumn afternoon in a small resort on the south coast of France.

Mellie, newly married to Toni, an airline navigator who is away at work, sees a strange man get off a bus. In a shop trying on a dress to wear to a wedding next day, she sees the man spying on her. When she goes home, he sneaks into the house, ties her up and rapes her. Realising after she has freed herself that he is still in the house, she gets out a shotgun and kills him. Then she drives the body to a cliff and tips it into the sea, saying nothing to her jealous husband when he returns.

Next day at the wedding an uninvited American called Dobbs speaks to her. A body has been found and he claims she killed him, which she denies. The day after that, when her husband is away again, Dobbs sneaks into their house and questions Mellie roughly. She begins to think that the rapist had business with Toni, possibly drug related, and that is why Dobbs is so persistent. She goes with him to the bank and, drawing out all she has, offers it to him. But he doesn't want money, just the truth.

Next morning Mellie finds the rapist's travel bag, containing 60,000 US dollars. Sneaking into Dobbs' hotel room, she searches it and discovers that he is a US Army colonel on a secret mission. He turns up and tells her a woman who works at a restaurant in Paris has been arrested for the murder. Distraught that an innocent woman is being charged, Mellie jumps onto a plane to Paris and goes to the restaurant, who send her to where the woman's sister works. This proves to be a brothel, where three criminals question Mellie roughly about the dead man. Dobbs, who has been trailing her, breaks in and saves her.

Taking her home, Dobbs reveals that the corpse is not that of the rapist but another man's. The rapist was an escapee from a US military prison who had attacked three women in similar fashion before Mellie. She then tells him where she tipped the body, which is found by police frogmen. For Dobbs the case is closed and he does not tell the police about Mellie. Nor does he mention the 60,000 dollars.

In a closing homage to Alfred Hitchcock, it is revealed that the rapist's name was Mac Guffin.

Cast

Production

Development
The film was shot in both English and French versions. In an interview with Variety, Bronson said he learned his lines in French phonetically, so that his own voice would be heard on the soundtrack. It was the last time he did this for European films, allowing himself to be dubbed-over in all subsequent films.

Filming
Filming began June 2, 1969 on the Giens Peninsula and finished August 4, 1969 on the French Riviera. Some scenes were shot in Paris.

Music
"Rider on the Rain" is also the main theme of the original movie soundtrack (with lyrics by Sébastien Japrisot and sung by French chansonette Severine). The American singer-songwriter Peggy Lee wrote English lyrics for the song, and recorded it on her 1971 album Make It With You as "Passenger of the Rain".

Release

Home media
In 2011, Wild East released Rider on the Rain on a limited-edition DVD alongside Adieu l'ami (Farewell, Friend), also starring Charles Bronson.

The 2009 British DVD, released by Optimum/Studio Canal contains both the French and English language versions. The French version runs a few minutes longer.

Reception

Box office
The film was a big hit in France, the third most popular movie of 1970.

Bronson's agent Paul Kohner said it was "the turning point for Bronson – and probably his best. In a few weeks, his name was so big in Europe that hundreds of theatres there were running old American pictures with the name Bronson above the title, even though originally he had played the third or fourth lead."

Critical response
The Los Angeles Times called the film "a spellbinding suspense and detection story, done with the kind of affectionate tip of the chapeau to the Hitchcock Hollywood mastery of the form." The Washington Post called it "one of those silk-purse-from a sow's ear exercises, fairly absorbing if you go to it casually, but possibly a cheat if you go expecting the last word in civilised movie expense." Richard Schikel wrote in Life that though the film was intended as homage to Hitchcock, it "lacks the humor, the humanity and the sure sense of mise en scène that distinguishes Hitchcock's great entertainments." In The Guardian, Philip French called it a cool, stylish, demented Hitchcockian thriller" and compared it to "Charade reworked by Claude Chabrol."

Accolades
In 1970, the film won the Special David of the David di Donatello Awards. In 1971, it won the Golden Globe Award for Best Foreign Language Film, was nominated for Best Motion Picture of the Edgar Allan Poe Awards, and for the Golden Laurel.

References

External links

1970 films
1970s mystery films
1970s psychological thriller films
French psychological thriller films
Italian psychological thriller films
1970s French-language films
Films directed by René Clément
Films produced by Serge Silberman
Films scored by Francis Lai
Films about rape
Best Foreign Language Film Golden Globe winners
English-language French films
English-language Italian films
1970s English-language films
1970 multilingual films
French multilingual films
Italian multilingual films
1970s Italian films
1970s French films